Faye Njie (born 23 November 1993) is a Finnish-born Gambian judoka. He was born in Helsinki, Finland to a Finnish mother and a Gambian father, and has represented both countries.

He represented Finland in 2009 European Cadet Championships, 2009 EYOF, and the 2011 and 2012 European Junior Championships, before switching to fight for the Gambia.

Njie was the first ever Olympic judoka for the Gambia. He competed at the 2016 Summer Olympics in Rio de Janeiro, in the men's 73 kg, where he was eliminated by Didar Khamza in the first round.

He competed in the men's 73 kg event at the 2020 Summer Olympics.

He competed in the men's 73 kg event at the 2022 Commonwealth Games, winning the country's first ever silver medal in the Games. Njie was also a silver medalist at the 2015 African Games.

References

External links
 
 
 

1993 births
Living people
People with acquired Gambian citizenship
Gambian male judoka
Competitors at the 2015 African Games
African Games medalists in judo
African Games silver medalists for the Gambia
Olympic judoka of the Gambia
Judoka at the 2016 Summer Olympics
Gambian people of Finnish descent
Sportspeople from Helsinki
Finnish male judoka
Finnish people of Gambian descent
Judoka at the 2020 Summer Olympics